Tilly Metz, born on May 26, 1967 in Luxembourg City, is a Luxemburgish politician and member of the Green Party (déi Gréng). After teaching humanities and social sciences, she was deputy director of the Lycée Technique pour Professions Educatives et Sociales (LTPES) in Mersch. She was mayor of the municipality of Weiler-la-Tour (Luxembourg) and has been a Member of the European Parliament since June 2018, as part of the Greens/EFA political group. She is particularly known for her stance on animal welfare, health-related issues and human rights.

Political Career 
During her studies in psychology and pedagogy Tilly Metz became involved in politics within the Luxembourg Socialist Party, via the Michel Welter Circle, which is mainly dedicated to health, education and disability issues. In 2001, she joined déi Gréng and became spokesperson from 2004 to 2009.

In 2005, Tilly Metz was elected mayor of the municipality of Weiler-la-Tour (Luxembourg), from 2005 to 2011. She was the first female mayor of the municipality and the first elected member of Déi Gréng. In October 2017, she was elected to the municipal council of the city of Luxembourg. 

In 2018, she succeeded Claude Turmes in the European Parliament, who had to leave his duties to replace Camille Gira, who died on May 16, 2018. She became a member of the European Parliament with The Greens/EFA political group.

In the European Parliament, she chairs the Delegation for relations with Central American countries (DCAM). She is also a permanent member of the Committee on the Environment, Public Health and Food Safety (ENVI), the Committee on Transport and Tourism (TRAN), and the Delegation to the Euro-Latin American Parliamentary Assembly (DLAT). She is an alternate member of the Committee on Agriculture and Sustainable Development (AGRI).

Tilly Metz chaired the special ANIT committee, which was created in June 2020, for a period of twelve months, and was responsible for examining allegations of infringements in the application of Union law on the protection of animals during transport and related operations inside and outside the Union.

Advocacy

Environment 
Having participated in the drafting of the report "From Farm to Fork", she denounces the increasingly intensive agricultural policy oriented towards exports, the consequences of which are harmful to the environment. Legislation aiming to reduce the use of pesticides comes up against the powerful lobbies of the agro-industry.

Concerning the Common Agricultural Policy (CAP), which represents almost a third of the European Union's budget, Tilly Metz regrets the lack of ambition: "For the reform of the Common Agricultural Policy (2021-2027), I would have liked to see clear political objectives that would contribute to achieving the EU's climate objectives, to curb the disappearance of species and to encourage small farms rather than multinationals. Unfortunately, neither the current nor the future CAP has achieved these goals".

As a member of the Transport and Tourism Committee in the European Parliament, Tilly Metz is the voice of the Greens/EFA for a more sustainable tourism industry. She also contributed to the legislation aiming at setting up a social climate fund to compensate for the increase in energy prices that weighs on the most economically and socially disadvantaged households.

Health 
Tilly Metz is very involved in the cause of rare diseases and disabilities. For 11 years, she was president of the association "Multiple sclerosis Lëtzebuerg" which aims to improve and facilitate the daily life of people with multiple sclerosis and their integration into society. It emphasizes the importance of access to rapid diagnosis and assistance to patients and their families during treatment.

In the European Parliament and in particular in the ENVI Committee, Tilly Metz is actively working on health issues. She has been a shadow negotiator for the Greens/EFA Group on several occasions, including the vote on the report on a pharmaceutical strategy and the proposal for a regulation of the European Parliament and of the Council on a stronger role for the European Medicines Agency in crisis preparedness and management as regards medicinal products and medical devices.

Tilly Metz was an alternate member of the Special Commission for Cancer Control in Europe (BECA), which was created in response to the growing prevalence of cancer in Europe. Indeed, it is estimated that 2.7 million new cases of cancer are diagnosed and 1.3 million people will have died of cancer in the EU by 2020.

With the creation of a special committee ''the COVID-19 pandemic: lessons learned and recommendations for the future'', Tilly Metz was chosen by the Greens/EFA Group to be the rapporteur on the future work of this committee on health.

In 2023, she signed an letter to the European Medicines Agency expressing concern about the lack of regulatory advances regarding psychedelic-assisted therapy.

Human Rights 
Tilly Metz is involved in the cause of human rights, notably through her presidency of the Delegation for relations with the countries of Central America (DCAM) in the European Parliament. It informs itself and organizes work on the political, economic, social, legal and human rights situation in the nine partner countries of Belize, Costa Rica, Cuba, the Dominican Republic, El Salvador, Guatemala, Honduras, Nicaragua and Panama. Its priorities are the protection of human rights, the rights of women and the LGBTQ+ community, as well as the protection of indigenous peoples and environmental defenders in this region.

She was particularly impacted by the case of Aura Lolita Chavez during a visit to Guatemala in 2018. This minority rights and environmental activist was a finalist for the Sakharov Prize in 2017.

Animal Welfare 
Tilly Metz was particularly committed to the fight for animal welfare in the early years of her term. She was appointed as head of commission of inquiry into the protection of animals during transport, the final report of which was approved in December 2021. She said that "It is important to ensure the same level of protection of animals during the entire journey, just as it is essential for transporters and drivers to have a single set of rules to comply with on cross-border transport." She denounced the excessive duration of animal transports, especially during journeys beyond the borders of the European Union. She also denounces the lack of harmonization of rules, controls and sanction systems within the European Union. The report recommends the establishment of criteria for transport vehicles.

According to her, citizens' initiatives such as "End the Cage Age", which received 1,397,113 signatures, have had a real impact on the work of the European Commission, which initiates legislation applicable to the countries of the European Union. Tilly Metz believes that "for many citizens, the primary motivation in calling for stricter rules and more sanctions is an ethical concern, a desire to see animal suffering avoided or at least reduced. So for them, any improvement would be a gain in itself, in addition to the reduction of public health risks and environmental concerns".

Tilly Metz is also opposing animal testing, believing that more efficient and ethical alternatives often exist. She considers it a victory that the European Parliament voted in favor of an action plan to phase out the use of animals in scientific experiments and tests. However, the text adopted is not binding on the Member States.

Nuclear Weapons 
In February 2019, Tilly Metz demonstrated alongside two other MEPs from the Green Group (Molly Scott Cato and Michèle Rivasi); as well as other Belgian activists from the organization Agir pour la Paix at the military base of Kleine-Brogel (Belgium) by blocking the runway for F16s. The three women wanted to draw attention to the US nuclear weapons that have been stored at the base since 1984 and to demand their removal. They continue to deplore the presence of the US nuclear weapons on European territory, particularly in the Netherlands and Italy. This poses significant security risks to the population, as the stockpiles are vulnerable to targeted attacks.

References

1967 births
Living people
People from Luxembourg City
Councillors in Luxembourg City
Women mayors of places in Luxembourg
The Greens (Luxembourg) politicians
21st-century women MEPs for Luxembourg
MEPs for Luxembourg 2014–2019
The Greens (Luxembourg) MEPs
MEPs for Luxembourg 2019–2024